Rouben Paul Adalian is the Director of the Armenian National Institute in Washington, D.C. and a professor at the Elliott School of International Affairs of George Washington University and at Johns Hopkins University.

Career
Adalian received his PhD in history from the University of California, Los Angeles in 1987; his dissertation focused on Nicholas Adontz. 

He is the author of many scientific works and articles, including Historical Dictionary of Armenia and From Humanism to Rationalism: Armenian Scholarship in the Nineteenth Century, where Adalian "has provided a useful overview of an important topic which has not received its just attention in the English language".

He is the editor of Armenia and Karabagh Factbook, and associate editor of award-winning Encyclopedia of Genocide.

References

Year of birth missing (living people)
Ethnic Armenian historians
American people of Armenian descent
Elliott School of International Affairs faculty
University of California, Los Angeles alumni
Living people
Armenian studies scholars
George Washington University faculty
Johns Hopkins University faculty
Place of birth missing (living people)